Grimke is a crater on Venus at latitude 7.1, longitude 95.8. It is 18 km in diameter and is named after Isabella Augusta Gregory.

Impact craters on Venus